These are the Oricon number one albums of 2000, per the Oricon Albums Chart.

Chart history

Trivia
Number-one album of 2000: Declicious Way by Mai Kuraki.
Most weeks at number-one: Ayumi Hamasaki and Ringo Sheena both with a total of 4 weeks.

External links
https://web.archive.org/web/20141021000023/http://www.geocities.jp/object_ori/indexa.html

See also
2000 in music

2000 record charts
Lists of number-one albums in Japan
2000 in Japanese music